Evan John Gray (born 18 November 1954) is a former New Zealand cricketer, who played 10 Tests and 10 One Day Internationals for New Zealand in the 1980s. 

He was selected as an all rounder, with 17 wickets at a bowling average of 52.11. In 1981–82 he and Ross Ormiston added 226 for Wellington against Central Districts. Since his debut Gray has played more games for a province than any other player in New Zealand. 

He is also the only player in the country's history to score more than 4000 runs and capture over 350 wickets for his province. Additionally he worked as a first class umpire for eight years.

References

External links
 

1954 births
Living people
New Zealand One Day International cricketers
New Zealand Test cricketers
New Zealand cricketers
Wellington cricketers
North Island cricketers